Roxanne Varza (born 1985) is Director of Station F, a startup campus in Paris, France where she is recognized as one of the most influential figures in the French startup ecosystem. The French media have called Varza the "young empress of startups,", the "queen of tech", and "the new pope of high-tech and startups in France." An Iranian-American who grew up in Silicon Valley, Varza was formerly a journalist and startup ambassador before being personally selected by Free founder Xavier Niel to spearhead the development of Station F.

Personal life
Varza was born in 1985 in Palo Alto, California, in a Zoroastrian Family. Her parents emigrated from Iran in 1979 during the Islamic Revolution. Varza obtained a bachelor's degree in French literature from UCLA. In 2007, she joined Business France, then known as the French International Investment Agency. Later, Varza decided to move to France for further studies. From 2009 to 2011, she pursued a dual degree between Sciences Po Paris and the London School of Economics, obtaining a master's degree in International Business and a degree in International Economic Policy.

Career
Varza was previously the head of French Microsoft start-up activities, including Bizspark and Microsoft Ventures and currently serves as Director of Station F, a large startup incubator facility in the 13th arrondissement of Paris. Prior to working with Microsoft, she was part of multiple European start-up companies and was the editor for TechCrunch France, which she received a job offer from after writing the blog TechBaguette. Her activities also include advising Silicon Valley corporations about opening in France. She co-founded Girls in Tech Paris, Girls in Tech London, and was the founder of the website Tech.eu. Girls In Tech organizes training courses in computer code writing for women.

In April 2013, Business Insider ranked Roxanne Varza among the 30 most influential women under 30 in the technology sector. She is currently an Ambassador for the European Innovation Council for the years 2021-2027.

References

1985 births
Living people
American women business executives
American business executives
American people of Iranian descent
American Zoroastrians
Iranian Zoroastrians
Businesspeople from California
People from Palo Alto, California
University of California, Los Angeles alumni
Sciences Po alumni
Alumni of the London School of Economics
Microsoft people
21st-century American businesspeople
21st-century American businesswomen